The Democratic Karen Buddhist Army - Brigade 5 (abbreviated DKBA-5), also known as the Democratic Karen Benevolent Army (abbreviated DKBA) and the Klo Htoo Baw Battalion by the Burmese government, is a Karen Buddhist insurgent group in Myanmar. The group was led by Bo Nat Khann Mway, also known as "Saw Lah Pwe", until his death in 2016.

The DKBA-5 split from the original Democratic Karen Buddhist Army in 2010 and is loosely affiliated with the Karen National Union. They have also worked with the Arakan Army.

During the 2010 general election, the DKBA-5 attacked government troops and security forces in Myawaddy Township, Kayin State. The group signed a ceasefire agreement with the government on 3 November 2011, though they have not agreed to disarming, unlike their DKBA predecessors in 2010.

References 

Rebel groups in Myanmar
History of Myanmar
Politics of Myanmar
Karen people
Buddhist paramilitary organizations
Paramilitary organisations based in Myanmar
Religious organizations established in 2010
2010 establishments in Myanmar